The 2015 TAB & Burger King Auckland Darts Masters was the inaugural staging of the tournament by the Professional Darts Corporation, as a fifth and final entry in the 2015 World Series of Darts. The tournament featured 16 players (eight PDC players facing eight regional qualifiers) and was held at The Trusts Arena in Auckland, New Zealand from 28–30 August 2015.

Adrian Lewis won the first edition of the tournament after defeating Raymond van Barneveld 11–10 in the final.

Prize money
The total prize fund was NZ$220,000.

Qualifiers
The eight seeded PDC players were:
 
  Phil Taylor (semi-finals)
  Michael van Gerwen (quarter-finals)
  Peter Wright (quarter-finals)
  Adrian Lewis (winner)
  Gary Anderson (quarter-finals)
  James Wade (semi-finals)
  Raymond van Barneveld (runner-up)
  Stephen Bunting (first round)

The Oceanic qualifiers were:
  Simon Whitlock (quarter-finals)
  Paul Nicholson (first round)
  David Platt (first round)
  Rob Szabo (first round)
  Laurence Ryder (first round)
  Mark Cleaver (first round)
  Rob Modra (first round)
  Craig Caldwell (first round)

Draw

References

Auckland Darts Masters
Auckland Darts Masters
World Series of Darts
Sport in Auckland
August 2015 sports events in New Zealand